The Oxford Children's Library was a reprint series of children's books published by the Oxford University Press from 1958 to 1974.

The series was announced "not so much as an invasion of the cheap market but as a lifeline thrown out to save a number of books (most of them post-war publications) from going prematurely out of print: those books that have proved themselves already at a higher price but can only now be reprinted in a normal sized edition at a price that would be prohibitive"

List of titles in the series

References

External links
 Publisher Series: Oxford Children's Library at LibraryThing

Series of children's books
Publications established in 1958
Publications disestablished in 1974
Oxford University Press
1958 establishments in England
1974 disestablishments in England